is a set of two Japanese illustrated handscrolls (emaki) commissioned by the samurai Takezaki Suenaga (1246–1314) as a record of his wartime deeds and valor during the Mongol invasions of Japan. The first scroll describes Suenaga's actions at the Battle of Bun'ei (1274), as well as his attempts to seek recognition and rewards from the government. The second scroll describes him at the naval Battle of Kōan (1281). 

The work dates itself to 1293, while scholars similarly believe it was composed between the late 13th century and early 14th century, during the Kamakura period. Their author and artist are unknown. Together, the scrolls contain some of the earliest artistic depictions of the Mongol invasions of Japan. Both scrolls are currently kept in the Museum of the Imperial Collections at Tokyo Imperial Palace.

Contents 
The scrolls alternate between written accounts and illustrations done in the yamato-e style. They focus on the actions of Takezaki Suenaga, a gokenin (shogun's vassal) from Hizen Province, depicting him and other Japanese troops in battle against the Mongol invaders, on land and at sea. Aside from scenes of combat, the text also gives insight into the Kamakura government's system of rewarding distinguished warriors, as well as the relationship between Suenaga and his benefactor, general Adachi Yasumori.

First scroll 

In the first scroll, twenty-nine year old Suenaga and his clansmen meet with commander Saburō Kagesuke, who would later testify in his favor before the government. They gather their forces, and travel to Hakata to meet the Mongol invaders, passing the torii gates of Hakozaki Shrine on the way. 

Suenaga and his brother-in-law, Mitsui Sukenaga, encounter a group of Mongol soldiers and force them to retreat. Suenaga then meets and fights against the main Mongol army at the Battle of Bun'ei, where he and his flagbearer are both dismounted after their horses were shot. Facing Mongol arrows and explosives, Suenaga is saved by a cavalry charge led by Shiraishi Michiyasu, another samurai.

After the battle, Suenaga travels to the capital city of Kamakura, dissatisfied that he had not been rewarded by the government for his valor in combat. On the way, he visits several shrines and makes offerings. At Kamakura, he meets with many government officials to appeal his case. They ignore him due to a lack of evidence, despite testimony from Suenaga's fellow warriors. At last, after a personal appeal to general Adachi Yasumori, Suenaga's military service is certified in writing, and he is awarded a fully equipped horse, as well as a plot of land in Higo Province.

Second scroll 
In the second scroll, Suenaga travels to Iyo Province to visit the house of Kawano Michiari, another samurai who fought the Mongols earlier on Shika Island. The two men discuss the state of the war. Suenaga then sets out with the samurai Kikuchi Takefusa, joining the other Japanese defenders in front of the defensive wall at Hakata Bay. 

Suenaga and his company intend to attack the Mongols at sea, but they have difficulty finding a ship. He tries to board the ship of general Adachi Yorimune (Yasumori's son), but is turned away. Finally, he finds a boat at Iki Island. He removes his helmet and sets out on a transport ship with other warriors, boarding a Mongol vessel at the Battle of Kōan, where he engages in close quarters combat on the deck.

Suenaga and his men cut off the heads of their enemies, presenting them to Adachi Morimune as evidence of their deeds. In the colophon, Suenaga personally expresses gratitude towards Adachi Yasumori for recognizing his accomplishments and bestowing rewards upon him. He then praises a Shinto kami that he had prayed to, stating that he saw the deity land on a cherry tree in a dream, a sign that the kami was responsible for him receiving the recognition he deserved.

Textual history 
The date of composition is recorded at the end of the second scroll as "the first year of the Einin era", or 1293 CE. However, the illustrations have been modified many times after its completion, with additions, alterations, and retouching. Both scrolls were lost at some point, and only rediscovered in the 18th century.

Copies 
Several copies of the scrolls exist:
 An 18th-century copy
 A 19th-century copy made by Fukuda Taika
 A 21st-century reconstruction

Details of characters

See also
Takezaki Suenaga
Battle of Bun'ei
Battle of Kōan
Mongol Invasions of Japan
List of National Treasures of Japan (paintings)

References

Bibliography

External links

Scrolls of the Mongol Invasions of Japan - Full digitized scans of the scrolls, multiple versions, including commentary, animated maps and translations. An annotated version is also accessible. 
Mōko Shūrai Ekotoba (蒙古襲来絵詞) - High resolution scans of the 18th century copy, digital archives of Kyushu University.

Emakimono
Japanese chronicles
National Treasures of Japan